Nicholas Deshais is an American journalist and editor who lives in Spokane, Washington.

Education 
Deshais graduated from Portland State University in 2008.

Career 
Deshais' work has appeared in Willamette Week, The Spokesman-Review, The Seattle Times, and the Missoulian, as well as on Northwest Public Broadcasting, Spokane Public Radio, OPB, Jefferson Public Radio, KUOW-FM and KHQ-TV.

In 2011, Deshais was named a finalist for the Livingston Award. In 2016–17, he was awarded a Knight-Wallace Fellowship.

His reporting has won numerous awards, including from the Association of Alternative Newsmedia, Society of Professional Journalists and the Utah Idaho Spokane Associated Press Association.

Deshais is the currently editor of Spokane's alt-weekly newspaper, The Inlander.

References 

21st-century American journalists
21st-century American newspaper editors
American male journalists
Date of birth missing (living people)
Editors of Washington (state) newspapers
Journalists from Oregon
Journalists from Washington (state)
Living people